Autlán de Navarro is a city and its surrounding municipality of the same name in the Costa Sur region of the southwestern part of the state of Jalisco in Mexico. At the Mexican census of 2005, the city had a population of 53,269. In 2010, the population had increased up to approximately 108,427, including all its delegations. The municipality has a surface area of 962.9 km². It is 192 kilometers away from the Guadalajara metropolitan area and 165 kilometers from Manzanillo, Colima. This department capital is the most populated and largest city of the Costa Sur region. It is a leader district in the region since, Autlán is an important commercial exchange center. In September 12, 2014 the Autlán metropolitan area was vouched for by the Congress of the Union.

Two recent mayors were Fernando Morán Guzmán (2010–2012) and Fabricio Israel Corona Vizcarra (2015–2018).

The name comes from the Nahuatl language, Aotli (water way, water channel or water ditch) and Tlan (place of or near) and means "next to the water ditch."

Notable natives and residents 

 Juan Corona, serial killer.
 Carlos Santana and his brother Jorge Santana, musicians.
 Efren Montaño-Plascencia, Presidente (Los Barritos).
 Luz Ramos, Mexican television actress and film actress (El Vato, Hasta que te conocí, Su nombre era Dolores, la Jenn que yo conocí)

References 

 Link to tables of population data from Census of 2005 INEGI: Instituto Nacional de Estadística, Geografía e Informática
 Jalisco Enciclopedia de los Municipios de México

External links 

 http://www.jalisco.gob.mx/es/jalisco/municipios/autlan-de-navarro Official website
 http://www.inafed.gob.mx/work/enciclopedia/EMM14jalisco/municipios/14015a.html

Municipalities of Jalisco